Quirino Armellini (31 January 1889 in Legnaro – 13 January 1975 in Rome) was an Italian military officer, who served as a general in both the Royal Italian Army and the Italian Army.

Biography
Armellini was commissioned into the Royal Italian Army as a second lieutenant in 1908, after graduating from the Military Academy of Modena, and participated in the Italo-Turkish War and the World War I.

After serving under the command of Pietro Badoglio in the Second Italo-Ethiopian War against the Ethiopian Empire, Armellini was appointed commander of the Italian African Police (PAI) in the Italian East Africa (AOI).

From February to August 1942, during the World War II in Yugoslavia, Armellini was appointed commander of the XVIII Army Corps in the Italian-occupied Dalmatia. After that, he was transferred to Southern Italy at the head of the IX Army Corps to defend the South-eastern coast.

After the fall of the Fascist regime in Italy on 25 July 1943, King Victor Emmanuel III appointed Armellini to succeed Benito Mussolini as commander of the Voluntary Militia for National Security (MVSN), the paramilitary wing of the National Fascist Party (PNF). Under his leadership, the MVSN was dissolved and integrated into the regular Royal Army.

After the World War II, Armellini was president of the Superior Council of the Italian Armed Forces.

See also
List of senior officers of the Blackshirts

References

External links

1889 births
1975 deaths
People from the Province of Padua
People of former Italian colonies
Italian generals
Italian military personnel of the Italo-Turkish War
Italian military personnel of World War I
Italian military personnel of the Second Italo-Ethiopian War
Italian military personnel of World War II
Italian resistance movement members
Knights of the Military Order of Savoy
Knights Grand Cross of the Order of Merit of the Italian Republic